British Parliamentary style is a major form of academic debate that originated in Liverpool in the mid 1800s. It has gained wide support globally and is the official format of the World Universities Debating Championship (WUDC).

Rules
British Parliamentary debates consist of four teams, containing two speakers each, which are divided into two sides that speak for and against the motion. Due to the style's origins in British parliamentary procedure, the two sides are called the Government and the Opposition. Similarly, sides are known as benches, consisting of two teams - an opening team and a closing team. Teams compete against all three other teams in the round, including against its own opening or closing team, which it is not expected to help. The order of speeches alternates between the two benches, starting with the first government speaker, until all eight participants have spoken. Speeches are usually either five or seven minutes in duration.

Whip speeches 
The final speaker from each bench is known as the Whip. Whip speakers cannot add new arguments, and must instead summarize, frame, and weigh the arguments presented in the debate in a way that shows that their team (Closing Government or Closing Opposition) wins the debate.

Points of Information
Speakers in the BP format can offer Points of Information (POIs) to opposing teams. To offer a POI during another speaker's speech, a debater may stand, say something such as "Point" or "Point of Information", and wait to be called on. The speaker may accept, reject, or ignore the POI. If they accept, the individual who offered the POI may state an argument, a rebuttal, or ask a question to the speaker for up to 15 seconds or until interrupted by the speaker. Speakers may reject POIs with a physical cue (e.g. waving one's hand) or a verbal indication of rejection.

Speakers are granted "protected time", during which no points of information may be offered. Most commonly, this is the first and last minute of a speech. 

Only speakers from the opposing bench may offer POIs to the current speaker. Speakers on the same side of the motion cannot do so even if they are from different teams (e.g. Opening and Closing Government may offer POIs to Opening Opposition, but Closing Opposition cannot).

Competitions in BP Style

The debating season closely follows the academic year in Northern Hemisphere English speaking countries. The first competitions are in Britain and Ireland in October & November, traditionally commenced by the Edinburgh Cup in the first week of October building up to World Championships held over the Christmas holidays. After "Worlds" the Cambridge and Oxford IVs are held. In the New Year the Trinity IV in Dublin, the premier tournament in Ireland, recommences the season. The season continues with a large number of IONA and European competitions in March and April. During May and June, the period annual examinations in many universities a small number of open competitions are held in preparation for the European Championship, or Euros. The Euros were initially held over the Easter break, but is now held over the summer, normally in August and concludes the European debating season.

The world championships, as well as many other tournaments, require team members to be registered students of a university or another tertiary-level institution. However, "open" tournaments also exist that allow non-students and composite teams to compete.

References

External links

An introductory Guide to BP Debating by Alex Deane.
Competitive Debating  by Dan Neidle
British Debate
World Debate Website
The Judges British Parliamentary Debating est.1999 - An extensive array of unconventional tutorials that focus on the alternative and fun aspects of debate.

Debate types
Parliament of the United Kingdom